Blue Mountain is a community in the Canadian province of Nova Scotia, located in Pictou County.

References

External links
Pictou County Placenames

Communities in Pictou County